Psathopyrgos (Greek: Ψαθόπυργος) is a tourist village and community in the municipal unit of Rio in the northern part of Achaea, Greece. Psathopyrgos is located on the Gulf of Corinth, south east of Cape Drepano, the northernmost point of the Peloponnese peninsula. The village has a small pebble beach and it is known to the locals and tourists for its fish taverns and nice views of the green mountains south of the village. 

It is located 2 km north east of Drepano and 9 km north east of Rio. The Greek National Road 8A (Patras - Aigio - Corinth)  pass south of the village. In the new railway line Athens-Corinth-Patras, which is currently under construction (June 2018), a railway stop is planned. The community Psathopyrgos consists of the villages Psathopyrgos and Kato Rodini.

Historical population

See also

List of settlements in Achaea

External links
Psathopyrgos cultural club

References

Populated places in Achaea
Rio, Greece